is a Japanese gravure idol, and a female talent. She is from Okazaki, Aichi, belonged to the show-business production Yume Kikaku. Her nickname is 'Kojocho' (means a factory manager), derives from her handle name of the official blog. She graduated from 'Kunitachi College of Music' (in Japan), and plays the piano.

Bibliography

Photobooks
 affettuoso 愛情をこめて, Bunkasha 2003
 N-102, Bauhaus 2004
 Crescendo (クレッシェンド), Saibunkan 2004

Filmography

Image Videos
 Sweet Fairy, Bauhaus 2004
 Exclamation [102cm爆乳], Com Alliance 2004
 102, Takeshobo 2004
 Itoshi Karada (イトオシイカラダ / The Coquettish Body), Line Communications 2004
 I wish..., Takeshobo 2005
 Mangetsu (満月 / Full Moon), Line Communications 2005
 Akatsuki no Megami (暁の女神 / The Goddess of Daybreak), 2005
 SELENA 月の女神, 2005
 Koibito Kibun (恋人気分 / Lover's Feeling), 2006
 Special DVD-BOX, 2006
 π, 2006
 Anata Iro (あなた色 / Your Color), 2006
 Venus Bi No Megami (Venus 美の女神), 2006
 Mizukake Matsuri Songkran (水かけ祭り~ソンクラン~ / Water Soak Festival Songkran), 2006
 Tomadoi (とまどい / Confusion), 2007
 Mikkai (密会 / Secret Meeting), 2007
 Itoshi No Catherine (愛しのカトリーヌ / Catherine of Lovely), 2007
 OH! Pai Homare (OH! パイ誉れ), 2007
 OH! Pai Odori (OH! パイ踊り), 2007
 Natural posture, 2008
 Killer Body, 2008

Stage dramas 
 Ginza Roman (銀座ロマン / A Romance at Ginza), 2005
 Hoshi no Ohimesama (星のお姫さま / A Princess of the Star), 2005
 Tengoku Byoto (天国病棟 / The Heaven's Ward), 2006
 I my me, 2006
 no emotion, 2007

TV programs
 Boku no Ikiru Michi - episode 7 (僕の生きる道 第7話), Fuji TV 2003
 Waterboys - episode 2 (ウォーターボーイ 第2話), Fuji TV 2003
 Akiba Limousine (秋葉りむじん), TV Tokyo 2003
 Odaiba Akashi Jo -GOLDEN- (お台場明石城 -GOLDEN-), Fuji TV, 2004
 Tokoro & Osugi no Tohoho Jinbutsuden (所&おすぎのトホホ人物伝), TV Tokyo 2005
 Joyu Damashi (女優魂), NTV 2005
 Kitano Talent Meikan (北野タレント名鑑), Fuji TV 2006
 Nep Vegas (ネプベガス), TBS 2006
 Keiji Muto's Sports Daihyakka (武藤敬司のスポーツ大百科), Tokai TV 2006
 Communi-TV Netsujo Hoso (コミュニTV 熱情放送), CATV 2007

V-Cinema
 Shura no Michi (修羅の道 / The Long and Winding Road), 2003

Discography

Songs
All of her songs were sung in the Japanese language.

Singles
 Dolce (ドルチェ), Prism Note Inc. 2006
 Fuyu ga Hajimaruyo (冬がはじまるよ), Avex Marketing 2007

Radio programs
 Hideaki Ota & Nozomi Takeuchi: Playful Spirits Club (太田英明・竹内のぞみ アソブココロ倶楽部), 17:15-17:30 on every Saturdays from October 2005 to March 2007

References

External links
 
 Yume Kikaku Official Website  - Official Web-page
 Nozomi Takeuchi no Nozomi-gaki  - Official Blog with her photographs, since March 2008

 Nozomi Takeuchi to LOVELOG Factory  - Former Official Blog with her photographs, from February 2006 to March 2007
 PRISM NOTE  - The publisher of 1st Single "Dolce"
 ZAK THE QUEEN: Nozomi Takeuchi Breaks Fresh Ground  - At "ZAKZAK", November 2007
  Gravure Idol Report: Nozomi Takeuchi  - At "Sponichi Annex", July 2006
 ZAK THE QUEEN 2004 New Year's Day Special: Nozomi Takeuchi  - At "ZAKZAK", January 2005
 ZAK THE QUEEN 2004: Nozomi Takeuchi  - At "ZAKZAK", 2004

Japanese television personalities
1980 births
Living people
People from Okazaki, Aichi
Japanese gravure idols
Musicians from Aichi Prefecture
Kunitachi College of Music alumni